Michigan's 3rd congressional district is a U.S. congressional district in West Michigan. From 2003 to 2013, it consisted of the counties of Barry and Ionia, as well as all except the northwestern portion of Kent, including the city of Grand Rapids. In 2012 redistricting, the district was extended to Battle Creek. In 2022, the district was condensed to the greater Grand Rapids and Muskegon areas, including portions of Kent, Muskegon and Ottawa counties. Redistricting removed Barry, Calhoun and Ionia counties.

The district is currently represented by Hillary Scholten, a member of the Democratic Party.

Cities, Townships, and Villages

Cities

Villages

Townships

Recent election results in statewide races

History of 3rd congressional district 
Prior to 1993, the 3rd congressional district largely consisted of Calhoun County and Eaton County, along with about half the area of Lansing, as well as Kalamazoo County (including the city of Kalamazoo, but not Portage and the adjacent south-ward township).  With the redistricting, the old 3rd district was split between the 6th and 7th congressional districts, with most of Lansing itself going to the 8th congressional district. Meanwhile, the new 3rd district became the Grand Rapids district, covering much of the territory which had previously constituted the 5th district from 1873 to 1993.

No Democrat had represented Grand Rapids in Congress since Richard Vander Veen from 1974 to 1977, prior to redistricting due to the 1990 census, which took effect in 1993 and moved Grand Rapids from the 5th to the 3rd congressional district. However, following the 2020 census, the 3rd district was redrawn once again, and in the 2022 midterm elections Democratic candidate Hillary Scholten was chosen to represent the district.

List of members representing the district

Recent election results

2012

2014

2016

2018

2020

2022

See also

Michigan's congressional districts
List of United States congressional districts

Notes

References 
Govtrack.us for the 3rd District – Lists current Senators and representative, and map showing district outline
The Political graveyard: U.S. Representatives from Michigan, 1807–2003

 Congressional Biographical Directory of the United States 1774–present

03
West Michigan
Barry County, Michigan
Ionia County, Michigan
Kent County, Michigan
Grand Rapids, Michigan
Constituencies established in 1843
1843 establishments in Michigan